The Prince of Avenue A is a 1920 American drama film directed by John Ford. The film is considered to be lost.

Plot
As described in a film magazine, Barry O'Connor (Corbett), son of Patrick O'Connor (Cummings), plumber and political power, is called to the residence of William Tompkins (Vroom), Tammany man, whom he is to "put over" in the coming election. Here Barry meets Mary Tompkins (Warren), and mutual admiration results in an invitation to a social affair at the Tompkins home. At the affair Barry's crude ways bring forth criticism and he leaves, offended. His father threatens to withdraw his support of the candidate but later changes his mind. The rupture is later healed when Mary and her father attend a ward ball and Mary leads the grand march with Barry. This begins the romance that culminates in the marriage of Barry and Mary.

Cast
 James J. Corbett as Barry O'Connor
 Richard Cummings as Patrick O'Connor
 Cora Drew as Mary O'Connor
 Frederick Vroom as William Tompkins
 Mary Warren as Mary Tompkins
 George Fisher as Regie Vanderlip
 Harry Northrup as Edgar Jones
 Mark Fenton as Father O'Toole
 John Cook as Butler (credited as Johnnie Cooke)
 Lydia Yeamans Titus as Housekeeper

See also
List of lost films

References

External links

1920 films
1920 drama films
1920 lost films
Silent American drama films
American silent feature films
American black-and-white films
Films directed by John Ford
Lost American films
Lost drama films
Universal Pictures films
1920s American films